Tolsti Vrh pri Mislinji is a dispersed settlement in the Municipality of Mislinja in northern Slovenia. It lies in the hills east of Mislinja. The area is part of the traditional region of Carinthia. It is now included in the Carinthia Statistical Region.

Name
The name of the settlement was changed from Tolsti Vrh to Tolsti Vrh pri Mislinji in 1952.

Cultural heritage
A small chapel-shrine in the settlement dates to the late 19th century.

References

External links
Tolsti Vrh pri Mislinji on Geopedia

Populated places in the Municipality of Mislinja